Henry Niles Pierce (October 19, 1820 – September 5, 1899) was the diocesan bishop of Arkansas in the Episcopal Church from 1870 until his death in 1899.

Early life and education
Pierce was born on October 19, 1820, in Pawtucket, Rhode Island. He studied at Brown University, graduating in 1842. He was awarded a Doctor of Divinity in 1866 from the University of Alabama, and a Doctor of Laws in 1869 from the College of William & Mary.

Career
He was ordained deacon on April 23, 1843, and then priest on January 3, 1849, on both occasions in Christ Church, Matagorda, Texas by Bishop George W. Freeman. He initially served as a missionary in Washington County, Texas, and then between 1854 and 1857, served in New Orleans and Rahway, New Jersey. In 1857, he became rector of St John's Church in Mobile, Alabama, while in 1868, he became rector of St Paul's Church in Springfield, Illinois.

Episcopacy
On October 14, 1869, Pierce was elected Missionary Bishop of Arkansas and was consecrated in Christ Church, Mobile, Alabama on January 25, 1870, by Bishop William Mercer Green of Mississippi. In 1871, when the Diocese of Arkansas was created, he became the first diocesan bishop. He remained in office until his death in 1899.

Bibliography
Pierce was the author of The Agnostic, and Other Poems.

See also

 List of bishops of the Episcopal Church in the United States of America

References

External links
 
 

1820 births
1899 deaths
19th-century American Episcopalians
Brown University alumni
People from Pawtucket, Rhode Island
Episcopal bishops of Arkansas
19th-century American clergy